Tom Bohli (born 17 January 1994) is a Swiss professional racing cyclist, who currently rides for UCI ProTeam . He rode at the 2015 UCI Track Cycling World Championships. In May 2019, he was named in the startlist for the 2019 Giro d'Italia.

Major results

Road

2011
 1st  Road race, National Junior Championships
2012
 National Junior Championships
1st  Road race
1st  Time trial
 8th Road race, UCI World Junior Championships
2013
 5th Time trial, National Under-23 Championships
2014
 2nd Time trial, National Under-23 Championships
 5th Overall Tour de Normandie
 UEC European Under-23 Championships
8th Time trial
9th Road race
 10th Chrono Champenois
2015
 1st Tour de Berne
 2nd Time trial, National Under-23 Championships
 6th Overall Tour de Normandie
1st Prologue
 9th Overall Tour de l'Eurométropole
 10th Overall ZLM Tour
2016
 1st Stage 5 (TTT) Eneco Tour
 8th Time trial, UCI World Under-23 Championships
 8th Overall Driedaagse van West-Vlaanderen
1st Prologue
2017
 1st Stage 1 (TTT) Volta a la Comunitat Valenciana
 1st  Young rider classification, Tour du Haut Var
 4th Time trial, National Championships
2018
 3rd Time trial, National Championships
2019
 5th Overall Okolo Slovenska
2020
 5th Time trial, National Championships
2022
 3rd Time trial, National Championships

Grand Tour general classification results timeline

Track

2012
 1st  Individual pursuit, UCI World Junior Championships
 UEC European Junior Championships
1st  Individual pursuit
2nd  Points
2013
 1st  Team pursuit, UEC European Under-23 Championships
2014
 UEC European Under-23 Championships
1st  Team pursuit
3rd  Individual pursuit
 1st  Individual pursuit, National Championships
2015
 UEC European Under-23 Championships
2nd  Individual pursuit
2nd  Team pursuit

References

External links
 

1994 births
Living people
Swiss male cyclists
Sportspeople from the canton of St. Gallen